"Be My Wife" is a song by English musician David Bowie. It was the second single from Low (1977), released on 17 June 1977.

Its presence in Low tones down the electronic feel of the rest of the album. The song also features a more conventional lyric which is closer to a traditional rock song than the more fragmented lyrics elsewhere on that album. The song features a ragtime piano opening, which serves the somewhat retro lyrics some justice, although it is soon set against a backdrop of guitars and drums. The song repeats its lyrics, changing the spacing of the lyrics amongst the song's verse. The song closes simply with a fadeout, as the song returns to the introductory ragtime riff repeating indefinitely, with the rest of the band playing behind it.

"Be My Wife" became the first new Bowie release since "Changes" to fail to break into the UK chart. It was frequently played live on the various tours after its release and Bowie is said to have repeatedly announced this song during live performances as "one of my favourites," as may be seen or heard in such concert footage or audio recordings.

Reception
Cash Box said that it "demonstrates the rock and roll side of 'Low.'" and that there is also "a shrill organ, unusual guitar and synthesizer lines, and the creative use of a barrelhouse piano."

Music video
"Be My Wife" apparently was Bowie's first official video since "Life on Mars?". The video is in fact rather similar: Bowie stands alone against a white backdrop singing the song alone. However, Stanley Dorfman's new clip featured a Bowie in make-up and clothing influenced by Buster Keaton and giving an irreverent, detached performance on a guitar, which does gel with the candid feeling generated by the song.

Track listing
All tracks written by David Bowie.
 "Be My Wife" – 2:55
 "Speed of Life" – 2:45

Personnel

 Producers:
 Tony Visconti
 David Bowie
 Musicians:
 David Bowie: lead vocals, lead guitars, pump bass
 Carlos Alomar: rhythm guitar
 George Murray: bass
 Dennis Davis: drums
 Roy Young: pianos
 Brian Eno: synthesizers

Live versions

 A live version was recorded during the Isolar II Tour for the Stage album, but was not released until 2005 on the remastered re-release of Stage.  Another live performance of the song, from later in the same 1978 tour, was included on the live album Welcome to the Blackout, released in 2018.
 A live performance filmed in Dublin in November 2003 during the A Reality Tour can be viewed on the DVD and is included on the corresponding album.

Other releases

 The song appeared on the following compilation albums:
 Sound + Vision box set (1989)
 Bowie: The Singles 1969-1993 (1993)
 It was released as a picture disc in the RCA Life Time picture disc set.
 Momus performed a cover version for his 2015 album Turpsycore.
 Max Lorentz released a version for his 2011 album Kiss You In The Rain - Max Lorentz Sings David Bowie.

References

 Pegg, Nicholas, The Complete David Bowie, Reynolds & Hearn Ltd, 2000, 

1977 singles
David Bowie songs
Songs written by David Bowie
Song recordings produced by David Bowie
Song recordings produced by Tony Visconti
RCA Records singles
Songs about marriage